Wang Jialing (November 28, 1934 – June 23, 2008) was a Chinese theoretical linguist specializing in phonology.

Education 
Wang graduated from the Department of Foreign Languages at Nankai University in 1954.

Career 
He started his career teaching at Tianjin #28 Middle School from 1954-1960. In 1960. Wand then joined the English Department (later Foreign Languages College) of Tianjin Normal University.

In the early 1980s, when in his fifties, Wang started his interest in theoretical linguistics and particularly generative phonology. In the following 20 years, he devoted himself to the introduction of phonological theories in Mainland China.  He served as the editor of many major linguistics journals in Mainland China and he co-edited with Norval Smith the book  (Mouton de Gruyter 1997).

Wang's research applied phonological theories to the analysis of Chinese phonological phenomena. His main research was in phonology with a special focus on "neutral tone", i.e. syllables without or losing lexical tone. At the time of his death, he was near the completion of his project on the analysis of neutral tones across Chinese dialects (National Social Science Foundation of China).

Books
 Wang, Jialing & Norval S.H. Smith (eds.) (1997) . Berlin/New York: Mouton de Gruyter.
 Lu, Jilun & Jialing Wang (eds.) (2003) . Tianjin Shehui Kexue Yuan Press [Tianjin Social Sciences Academy Press]. (In Chinese)

Selected publications
 Wang, Jialing (1997) The representation of the neutral tone in Chinese Putonghua. In Wang, Jialing & Norval S.H. Smith (eds.) (1997) . Berlin/New York: Mouton de Gruyter. 157-184.
 Wang, Jialing (2002a) An OT analysis of neutral tone in three Chinese dialects.  [Linguistic Sciences] 1.1:78–85. (In Chinese)
 Wang, Jialing (2002b) OT and the Tone Sandhi and tone neutralization in Tianjin Dialect.  [Studies of the Chinese Language] 4.289:363–371. (In Chinese)

References

1934 births
2008 deaths
Chinese phonologists
Nankai University alumni